Cyrus Redding (1785–1870) was a British journalist and wine writer.

Biography
Redding was born in Cornwall. The son of a Baptist minister, he was privately educated. He moved to London about 1806, and worked for the Pilot (est. 1807)  before editing the Plymouth Chronicle and then the West Briton and Cornwall Advertiser which he founded in 1810.

Travelling to Paris in 1814, Redding edited Galignani's Messenger from 1815 to 1818, as well as providing Paris correspondence for the Examiner.

Between 1821 and 1830 Redding effectively edited The New Monthly Magazine (owned by Henry Colburn, and nominally edited by Thomas Campbell). From 1831 to 1833 Redding and Campbell edited The Metropolitan Magazine. He edited the Bath Guardian (1834–5) and the Staffordshire Examiner (1836–40). In 1841 he made two unsuccessful attempts to found journals, the English Journal and London Journal.

After that time he abandoned journalism for the writing of books. To his earlier novel, Gabrielle (1829), a children's book on shipwrecks (1833) and his history of wine (1833), he now began a series of county histories, memoirs of William Beckford and Thomas Campbell, and volumes of autobiography and reminiscences.

Works
 1829 --  Gabrielle: a Tale of the Swiss Mountains.  London: John Ebbers & Co.
 1833 --  Shipwrecks and Disasters at Sea with Jean Louis Hubert Simon de Perthes. London: Whittaker, Treacher, & Co. 
 1833 --  A history and description of modern wines. London: Whittaker, Treacher, & Arnot. OCLC  6498122 
 1839 --  Every Man His Own Butler. London: Whittaker & Co. OCLC 25057151
 1842 --  An illustrated itinerary of the county of Cornwall. London: How and Parsons. 
 1844 --  An illustrated itinerary of the county of Lancaster. London: Routledge. 
 1846 --  Velasco. London: T.C. Newby.  OCLC 10905947
 1859 --  Memoirs of William Beckford of Fonthill, with William Beckford. London: C.J. Skeet. 
 1858 --  Fifty Years' Recollections, Literary and Personal, with Observations on Men and Things 3 vols.  London: C.J. Skeet. 
 1860 --  Literary reminiscences and memoirs of Thomas Campbell. London: C.J. Skeet.  OCLC 5622942
 1867 --  Personal Reminiscences of Eminent Men. London: Saunders, Otley.

References
Thomas Seccombe, ‘Redding, Cyrus (1785–1870)’, rev. Ray Boston, Oxford Dictionary of National Biography, Oxford University Press, 2004, accessed 3 Jan 2008
Redding, Fifty Years' Recollections, 1859 ed. at Google Books

External links

 

1785 births
1870 deaths
Writers from Cornwall
English male journalists
19th-century English novelists
English male novelists
19th-century English male writers
Wine writers